Gordon Mackay may refer to:

 Gordon Mackay (wrestler), wrestler from New Zealand
 Gordon Mackay (rugby union) (1969–2008), Scottish rugby union player